Crystal Mason is an African-American woman who was convicted of attempting to cast a vote while on federal supervised release during the 2016 United States presidential election. Mason was under supervised release after completing a five-year sentence for tax fraud. She cast a provisional ballot after arriving at her polling place and finding her name stripped from the sign-in sheets. She was convicted three months later for voter fraud and sentenced to five years imprisonment. On March 31, 2021 the Texas Court of Criminal Appeals agreed to consider Mason's appeal.

Background 
Mason committed tax fraud by inflating returns for her clients as a tax preparer, a crime for which she was arrested and pled guilty in 2011 and was sentenced in 2012. She was released after completing her sentence in 2016, and decided to vote in the 2016 election after being encouraged by her mother. Per a statement by the Tarrant County Criminal District Attorney Office, a letter detailing her inability to vote was sent shortly after her incarceration for tax fraud. Mason said she never received the letter, as she was already incarcerated. The state prohibits convicted felons from voting while they serve their sentence, while on parole, probation or under supervision.

Shortly before entering the White House, President Donald J. Trump raised claims that 3 million illegal ballots had been cast in the 2016 election. In 2016, about 40,000 people in Texas cast provisional ballots that were later rejected. Additionally, in Tarrant County where she voted, more than 12,000 people have voted using a provisional ballot since 2014 with seven out of eight ballots rejected, and Mason seems to be the only voter who used this method to be charged with illegal voting.

Voter fraud 
On November 8, 2016, Mason drove to her polling place in Rendon, Texas. When she attempted to sign in, the volunteer could not find her name on the sheets and gave her a provisional ballot that would be counted if her credential were valid. Written on the ballot is a statement that cautions individuals and explains that a person cannot vote if he or she is on supervised release as Mason was. Mason said she did not see the statement on the ballot, as an election worker was helping her. Mason was convicted and sentenced to five years imprisonment. Multiple efforts are ongoing to appeal or overturn the conviction.

Legal 
Mason was convicted in 2018 for trying to vote in the 2016 election while on supervised release from her prior tax fraud felony conviction. During her initial trial, a probation official stated that he never told Mason that she could not vote, while Mason stated that she signed an affidavit that stated she was an eligible voter.

Mason was represented by the American Civil Liberties Union of Texas, the ACLU Voting Rights Project, the Texas Civil Rights Project, and two personal attorneys. In her appeal for the voter fraud conviction, Mason's defense team argued that it was unclear if Mason was truly ineligible to vote, or if she even voted since the provisional ballot was rejected and not tallied in the count.

In March 2020, three Texas judges rejected her appeal. Judge Wade Birdwell wrote the decision for the three judge panel, stating that the fact that Mason did not know she was legally ineligible to vote was irrelevant to her prosecution and that the state only needed to prove that she voted while knowing that she was under supervision and therefore ineligible. Tarrant County District Attorney Sharen Wilson offered Mason and her attorneys the option of probation instead of a jail sentence or a continued legal battle, but Mason refused.

On November 30, 2020, Mason's attorneys filed a petition with the Texas Court of Criminal Appeals to review the case. The petition asserts that the lower court ruling violates Texas law and conflicts with the Court's previous ruling in DeLay v. State. The conviction of former Republican U.S. Rep. Tom DeLay was thrown out on the basis that an individual must "know" that their conduct violates the Election Code. Andre Segura, legal director for the ACLU of Texas, was quoted in a press release, "The same result must apply to Crystal—a woman who was not aware she was ineligible to vote and had no reason to risk her liberty." On March 31, 2021, the Texas Court of Criminal Appeals has agreed to consider Crystal Mason's appeal.

Response 
Supporters of Mason and voter rights activists have pointed out the discrepancy between Mason's sentencing and the sentencing of Terri Lynn Rote, who tried to vote for Donald Trump twice; Bruce Bartman, who voted under his own name and, using an expired identification, on his deceased mother's ballot; and Justice of the Peace Russ Casey, who admitted to forging signatures to get on the primary ballot. Rote, Bartman, and Casey received two and five years' probation instead of Mason's five-year sentence to jail. Critics of Mason point out that Rote, Bartman, and Casey pleaded guilty in order to receive probation, while Mason rejected a similar plea deal and chose to go to trial.

Demonstrators protested against her sentencing on Labor Day in 2020, along with protesting the perceived lack of transparency about voting rights for convicted felons.

References 

Voter suppression
2016 in Texas
Fort Worth, Texas
Year of birth missing (living people)
Living people